Around the Sun is the 13th studio album by American alternative rock band R.E.M., released on October 5, 2004 on Warner Bros. Records.

Description

The album was released in three editions: Cassette (the band's final release on the medium), compact disc and a limited-edition box set with the CD and fold-out posters by 14 different artists illustrating the songs.

"The Outsiders" features a guest appearance by rapper Q-Tip. When the song was performed live, Michael Stipe carried out the rap, as he did on a later B-side release of the song.

"Final Straw" is a politically charged song. The version on the album is a remix of the original version, which had been made available as a free download on March 25, 2003, from the band's website. The song was written in protest of the U.S. government's actions in the Iraq War. The song evolved from an instrumental demo titled "Harlan County with Whistling," recorded during the sessions for the band's 1994's album Monster and released with its 25th anniversary edition in 2019.

Around the Sun was the first of only two R.E.M. albums to include a title track (the second being its follow-up, Accelerate). The album was also a first for R.E.M. in that it was their first to feature Bill Rieflin, the band's de facto replacement for former drummer Bill Berry, who'd retired in 1997. Although Rieflin was never officially inducted into the band as a member, he would serve as a regular auxiliary musician for R.E.M. until the band's dissolution in 2011.

Reception

Despite hitting #1 in the UK, it became their first studio album to miss the U.S. Top 10 (reaching #13 during seven weeks on the Billboard 200) since 1988's Green, and still awaits a gold record. As of March 2007, Around the Sun had sold 2 million copies worldwide and 232,000 units in the U.S. This is less than R.E.M. sold in the first week of an album's release while at their early to mid-1990s commercial peak.

Lead single "Leaving New York" became a UK Top 5 hit, while "Aftermath," "Electron Blue" and "Wanderlust" became minor hits. Around the Sun had no singles success in the United States. It was the band's first studio album to fail to chart a song on the Hot 100 since Fables of the Reconstruction in 1985.

After the release of the following Accelerate, guitarist Peter Buck said Around the Sun "just wasn't really listenable, because it sounds like what it is: a bunch of people that are so bored with the material that they can't stand it anymore." "The songs on Around the Sun are great," remarked singer Michael Stipe. "But, in the process of recording, we lost our focus as a band." The album's songs were largely excluded from the band's live setlists after the release of Accelerate.

Retrospectives of the band's career cite this album as their nadir. In 2023, Rolling Stone marked this as number 44 on their list of 50 horrible albums by brilliant artists, calling all of their post-Bill Berry studio albums "stellar" except for this one.

Reissue
In 2005, Warner Bros. Records issued an expanded two-disc edition of Around the Sun which includes a CD, a DVD-Audio disc containing a 5.1-channel surround sound mix of the album done by Elliot Scheiner, and the original CD booklet with expanded liner notes.

A remix of the song "Final Straw" appeared earlier in 2004 on the compilation album Future Soundtrack for America.

Track listing
All songs written by Peter Buck, Mike Mills and Michael Stipe.

"Leaving New York" – 4:49
"Electron Blue" – 4:12
"The Outsiders" (feat. Q-Tip) – 4:14
"Make It All Okay" – 3:44
"Final Straw" – 4:07
"I Wanted to Be Wrong" – 4:35
"Wanderlust" – 3:03
"Boy in the Well" – 5:22
"Aftermath" – 3:55
"High Speed Train" – 5:02
"The Worst Joke Ever" – 3:38
"The Ascent of Man" – 4:07
"Around the Sun" – 4:28

Personnel
R.E.M.
Peter Buck – guitar, production
Mike Mills – bass guitar, keyboards, production
Michael Stipe – vocals, production, packaging

Additional musicians
 Jamie Candiloro – engineer, mixing, musician
 Scott McCaughey – guitar
 Q-Tip – rapping on "The Outsiders"
 Bill Rieflin – drums, percussion
 Hahn Rowe – musician
 Ken Stringfellow – keyboards

Technical personnel
 Chris Bilheimer – packaging
 Oswald "Wiz" Bowe – assistant engineer
 Jim Briggs III – assistant engineer
 DeWitt Burton – technical assistance
 Alex Dixon – assistant
 Bertis Downs – advisor
 Thomas Roman Dozol – photography, cover photo
 Bryan Gallant – assistant
 Ted Jensen – mastering
 Patrick McCarthy – producer, mixing
 Kirk McNally – assistant engineer
 Javier Valverde – assistant engineer
 Bob Whittaker – technical assistance

Certifications

Charts

Weekly charts

Year-end charts

References

External links

2004 albums
Albums produced by Michael Stipe
Albums produced by Mike Mills
Albums produced by Peter Buck
Albums produced by Pat McCarthy (record producer)
Albums recorded at The Warehouse Studio
R.E.M. albums
Warner Records albums